Medicine Creek Dam (National ID # NE01073) is a dam in Frontier County, Nebraska.

The earthen and rockfill dam was constructed in 1948 and 1949 by the United States Bureau of Reclamation. It impounds Medicine Creek for flood control, part of the Frenchman-Cambridge Division of the Bureau's extensive Pick–Sloan Missouri Basin Program. The dam is owned and operated by the Bureau.

It was named for the founding editor of the local McCook Daily Gazette.

Recreation includes fishing (for walleye, crappie, white bass, channel catfish, etc.), hunting, boating, camping and hiking.  The state of Nebraska maintains the surrounding Medicine Creek State Wildlife Recreation Area, Medicine Creek Reservoir State Recreation Area, and Medicine Creek State Recreation Area.

References

External links 
 online recreation map

Dams in Nebraska
Reservoirs in Nebraska
United States Bureau of Reclamation dams
Buildings and structures in Frontier County, Nebraska
Dams completed in 1949
Bodies of water of Frontier County, Nebraska